Tiquicheo de Nicolás Romero is a municipality located in the Mexican state of Michoacán. The municipality has an area of 1,429.65 square kilometres (4.89% of the surface of the state) and is bordered to the north by the municipality of Tzitzio, to the east by Tuzantla and the state of México, to the south by San Lucas, Huetamo and the state of Guerrero, and to the west by Carácuaro and Madero. The municipality had a population of 13,665 inhabitants according to the 2005 census.  Its municipal seat is the city of Tiquicheo.

Assassination
Tiquicheo's one-time mayor, Maria Santos Gorrostieta, was murdered in 2012, after having survived two assassination attempts while she was in office from 2008–2011. In one of those attempts her husband, Jose Sanchez, was killed. Speculation centered on drug gangs.

References

Municipalities of Michoacán